Polyanki is the name of several rural localities in Russia.

Modern localities
Polyanki, Chuvash Republic, a selo in Streletskoye Rural Settlement of Yadrinsky District in the Chuvash Republic; 
Polyanki, Ilyinsky District, Ivanovo Oblast, a village in Ilyinsky District of Ivanovo Oblast
Polyanki, Komsomolsky District, Ivanovo Oblast, a village in Komsomolsky District of Ivanovo Oblast
Polyanki, Kostroma Oblast, a village in Buyakovskoye Settlement of Susaninsky District in Kostroma Oblast; 
Polyanki, Saransk, Republic of Mordovia, a village in Zykovsky Selsoviet under the administrative jurisdiction of Oktyabrsky City District of the city of republic significance of Saransk in the Republic of Mordovia; 
Polyanki, Temnikovsky District, Republic of Mordovia, a selo in Zhegalovsky Selsoviet of Temnikovsky District in the Republic of Mordovia; 
Polyanki, Oryol Oblast, a settlement in Vysokinsky Selsoviet of Mtsensky District in Oryol Oblast; 
Polyanki, Rostov Oblast, a settlement in Kirovskoye Rural Settlement of Tselinsky District in Rostov Oblast; 
Polyanki, Kasimovsky District, Ryazan Oblast, a village in Lyubovnikovsky Rural Okrug of Kasimovsky District in Ryazan Oblast
Polyanki, Spassky District, Ryazan Oblast, a village in Razberdeyevsky Rural Okrug of Spassky District in Ryazan Oblast
Polyanki, Smolensk Oblast, a village in Oktyabrskoye Rural Settlement of Krasninsky District in Smolensk Oblast
Polyanki, Republic of Tatarstan, a selo in Spassky District of the Republic of Tatarstan
Polyanki, Ulyanovsk Oblast, a selo in Sursky Settlement Okrug in Sursky District of Ulyanovsk Oblast
Polyanki, Vologda Oblast, a village in Nesvoysky Selsoviet of Vologodsky District in Vologda Oblast
Polyanki, Yaroslavl Oblast, a selo in Tatishchevsky Rural Okrug of Rostovsky District in Yaroslavl Oblast

Abolished localities
Polyanki, Penza Oblast, a village in Zasechny Selsoviet of Mokshansky District in Penza Oblast; abolished in October 2011

Historical names
Polyanki, former name of Kamskiye Polyany, an urban-type settlement in Nizhnekamsky District of the Republic of Tatarstan

Alternative names
Polyanki, alternative name of Bolshiye Polyany, a selo in Redkodubsky Selsoviet of Ardatovsky District in the Republic of Mordovia;